Christa Brittany Allen (born November 11, 1991) is an American actress. She is known for playing the younger version of Jennifer Garner's character in both 13 Going on 30 (2004) and Ghosts of Girlfriends Past (2009). In 2006, she starred as the titular character in the CBS children's television series Cake. She played socialite Charlotte Grayson on the ABC drama television series Revenge from 2011 to 2015.

Early life
Allen was born in Wildomar, California. She is the youngest of nine siblings, with eight older brothers. She once spent a summer in a circus.

Career
Allen made a brief appearance on The Man Show, and appeared in several students films and commercials. She played the younger version of Jennifer Garner's character in the comedy film 13 Going on 30 (2004), when she was just 13 years old. She again played Garner's younger version in Ghosts of Girlfriends Past (2009). She also had roles in numerous films, including A Merry Little Christmas (2006), Youth in Revolt (2009), One Wish (2010), One Kine Day (2011) and Detention of the Dead (2012). Allen starred as the titular character in the CBS children's television series Cake in 2006.

In 2011, Allen landed one of the main roles as socialite Charlotte Grayson in ABC's drama series Revenge. Allen's last credited appearance as a series regular was the sixth episode of the fourth season, but later returned for the series finale as a guest star. She had guest roles in television shows such as Medium, Cory in the House, The Suite Life on Deck, Grey's Anatomy, ER, CSI: Crime Scene Investigation, Wizards of Waverly Place and Cold Case. In 2015, she had a recurring role as Robyn on the ABC Family sitcom Baby Daddy. In May 2021, she wrote an essay about turning 30 years old for Yahoo!'s website.

Allen is part of a musical act called Pour Vous, which means “for you” in French, with Johnny What. In April 2018, the duo's first single called "Scorpio" was released.

Filmography

References

External links

Living people
1991 births
21st-century American actresses
Actresses from California
American child actresses
American film actresses
American television actresses
People from Wildomar, California